The 1999 Nordic Tournament was the third edition and took place in Lahti, Trondheim, Falun and Oslo between 6–14 March 1999.

Results

Overall

References

External links
Official website 

1999 in ski jumping
Nordic Tournament